The Sri Lankan national cricket team toured New Zealand from 26 December 2014 to 29 January 2015 for a tour consisting of two Test matches and seven One Day Internationals. New Zealand won the Test series 2–0 and the ODI series 4–2.

Following the tour the Sri Lankan team stayed in the region to participate in the 2015 ICC Cricket World Cup. The Test match played at Hagley Oval, Christchurch was the first major event to take place in the city since the 2011 Christchurch earthquake.

After the fourth ODI, Sri Lanka skipper Angelo Mathews was injured and captaincy shifted to vice captain Lahiru Thirimanne for other three ODIs. New Zealand skipper Brendon McCullum also did not play the last ODI, where Kane Williamson was the skipper.

Squads

Tour match

New Zealand XI v Sri Lankans

Test series

1st Test

2nd Test

ODI series

1st ODI

2nd ODI

3rd ODI

4th ODI

5th ODI

6th ODI

7th ODI

References

External links
 Series Page on Wisden
 Series home at ESPN Cricinfo

2015 in New Zealand cricket
Sri Lankan cricket tours of New Zealand
International cricket competitions in 2014–15
2014–15 New Zealand cricket season